The Indochinese short-tailed shrew (Blarinella griselda) is a species of mammal of the family Soricidae found in China and Vietnam. The species is a semifossorial red-toothed shrew with a stout body and short, slender tail. Blarinella is distinguished from all other Southeast Asian shrew genera by their long claws, intensive colored red-tipped teeth, and five upper unicuspids. Although this species is classified under Blarinella, recent Cytochrome b analysis suggests this species should be classified under a new genus.

References

Blarinella
Mammals described in 1912
Taxa named by Oldfield Thomas